Hans-Helmut Trense (born 17 August 1940) is a German athlete. He competed in the men's long jump at the 1964 Summer Olympics.

References

1940 births
Living people
Athletes (track and field) at the 1964 Summer Olympics
German male long jumpers
Olympic athletes of the United Team of Germany
Place of birth missing (living people)